WWE Music Publishing, Inc.; trade name WWE Music Group, LLC., is an American record label funded and operated by World Wrestling Entertainment (WWE). It was manufactured and co-marketed by Columbia Records and was distributed by Sony Music. The label specializes in compilation album of the WWE wrestlers' entrance themes, often by contributing performing artists, but also releases titles that have been actually performed by the wrestlers themselves, including the various-artists album WWE Originals and John Cena's You Can't See Me.

Historically, most WWE entrance themes have been created by Jim Johnston since the 1980s, while in recent times, themes have been written or performed by John Alicastro and Mike Lauri, known collectively as CFO$ from 2014 to 2020.

History

Beginnings 
The series of WWE (WWF) produced albums began in 1985 with The Wrestling Album. The album contained the song "Land of a Thousand Dances", recorded by a majority of the WWF roster at the time (including Roddy Piper, Jesse Ventura, and Randy Savage). The locker room would later reconvene for the song's music video.

Later in 1993, WrestleMania: The Album was released, but it failed to chart on the Billboard 200. By 2002, however, it had sold a total of 91,000 copies.

Format change and success 
The format of the wrestling albums changed in 1996, as the focus went from the wrestlers themselves singing to a compilation of various wrestlers' entrance themes. WWF Full Metal: The Album was the first album released with the new focus, and included the Monday Night Raw theme "Thorn in Your Eye" by Slam Jam, a supergroup composed of members of metal bands Anthrax, Savatage, Pro-Pain, and Overkill. In October, the album reached No. 184 on the Billboard 200 and by 2002, had sold 173,000 copies. This new format proved to be a success. The follow-up album, WWF The Music, Vol. 2, which was released two years later, spent sixteen weeks on the chart and sold over 480,000 copies.

WWF The Music, Vol. 3 and WWF The Music, Vol. 4, released in December 1998 and November 1999 respectively, each sold over one million copies. In particular, Vol. 3 reached No. 10 on the Billboard 200, spent thirty weeks on the chart, and sold over 1.21 million copies. The album reached position No. 4 in its début week, stayed on the charts for twenty weeks, and sold over 1.13 million copies.

On March 21, 2000, the company worked with Priority Records to release a hip hop music album titled WWF Aggression, which involved rappers such as Snoop Dogg, Ol' Dirty Bastard, Method Man, and Kool Keith, all of whom recorded versions of various wrestlers' entrance themes. This album differed from previous albums, which were more along the lines of rock music. Despite the change, the album still sold approximately 640,000 copies.

In October 2000, WWE announced the launch of the record label under the name SmackDown! Records, with Ron McCarrell as the president.

In February 2001, WWF The Music, Vol. 5 débuted on the Billboard 200 at position No. 2, spending two weeks in the top twenty and selling 176,000 copies. as well as reaching No. 2 in the UK Albums Chart and No. 5 in the Canadian Albums Chart. The album included an original song by Dwayne Johnson. By 2002, Vol. 5 had sold 640,000 copies. In September 2001, the WWF Tough Enough album sold 138,000 copies.

In May 2001, WWE signed their first act, the heavy metal band Neurotica, and released their third album in June 2002, the only non-wrestling related album released on the label so far, before they disbanded.

In 2002, WWF Forceable Entry sold 145,000 copies in its first week to enter the Billboard 200 at position No. 3. It was the fourth consecutive WWE album to début in the top ten of the Billboard 200. Forceable Entry also débuted on the Billboard Hard Rock Albums Chart. The album included music from Creed, Our Lady Peace, Limp Bizkit, Marilyn Manson, Kid Rock, Drowning Pool, Rob Zombie, Sevendust, and Saliva. Later in the year, WWE Anthology was certified platinum after just 10 days of release.

As of March 2006, WWE officially announced the launching of the "WWE Music Group" under the management of Neil Lawi, who not only maintains the label but selects songs to be used on television and pay-per-view events, and regularly scouts new talent to showcase via WWE. Within two months of operation, the newly restructured label had an album reach the top 10 of the Billboard 200 when WWE Wreckless Intent, with songs by artists such as Motörhead, Three 6 Mafia, P.O.D., and Killswitch Engage, reached No. 8. In 2007, the label released ¡Quiero Vivir!, the début album of WWE ring announcer Lilian Garcia, in conjunction with Universal Music Latin Entertainment.

In 2007, WWE released WWE The Music, Volume 7, the company's first digital-only album, on iTunes, and starting in 2012, WWE began making old albums available through online stores, starting with the first five "Volume" albums released from 1995 to 2001.

On April 20, 2013, the entrance theme of wrestler Fandango reached No. 44 in the UK Singles Chart, after briefly being close to the Top 10 in the mid-week charts. Following the NXT Arrival show on February 27, 2014, WWE released singles of eight NXT wrestlers created by CFO$, and it was followed in May by the music video and single of Tyler Breeze.

On November 30, 2017, it was reported that Jim Johnston's contract with the WWE had expired and that the company had released him after more than thirty-two years of employment.

Disputed issues 
Composer James D. Papa filed a lawsuit against the WWE Music Group, Michael Hayes, and Jim Johnston in July 2012 over the use of the music from World Championship Wrestling, citing redirected royalty payments to several wrestling related songs he either wrote or co-wrote by securing the rights to music unlawfully. Along with the defendants of the case were long with VE Newco LLC, the parent company of Gaiam Vivendi Entertainment (distribution of WWE DVD and Blu-rays), Yuke's (WWE video games), and Take-Two Interactive (who owns the WWE video game license after THQ filed for bankruptcy in January 2013) were added in September 2013.

The filing noted that the two sides resolved their issues following an alternative dispute resolution conference because there are a number of WWE Network versions of list of NWA/WCW closed-circuit events and pay-per-view events using all 11 songs from the Slam Jam CD that were placed on the Network, replacing versions of the PPV that had edited out the original music. A similar lawsuit brought against the company by Harry Slash & The Slashtones and Roderick Kohn over the rights to original music used by Extreme Championship Wrestling that WWE had been using during the Invasion was resolved with a settlement that saw WWE purchase the catalogue outright in January 2005 along with the assets in 2003 in bankruptcy court.

The case was then settled in court on May 5, 2014, before the March 23, 2015, trial date. However, WWE has again denied any wrongdoing and claimed that since Papa "consented to use" of his music in WCW and World Class Championship Wrestling broadcasts, and subsequently, WWE would have the rights to his material since they acquired the copyrights lawfully. WWE also said that the music in the World Class documentary would be "fair use" and that Papa did not have any copyright for the "clone song" that Johnston created, so any claim against that song should be thrown out.

In other media 

In September 2017, a commercial for Toyota Camry used John Cena's entrance theme "The Time is Now".
In NHL 17, Adam Rose's entrance theme song, "Break Away" by CFO$ is used as the goal song for the Ottawa Senators.
In the 2017–18 NHL season, the Washington Capitals used Oney Lorcan's theme song "Combative" by CFO$ as their official goal song.

Discography

Compilation albums

Single-artist albums

Soundtrack albums

See also 

Music in professional wrestling
TNA Knockout Music
Lists of record labels

References

External links 
 

American record labels
WWE
Professional wrestling music